Kani Sorkh may refer to:
 Kani Sorkh, Kurdistan
 Kani Sorkh, West Azerbaijan